This article lists all power stations in Uruguay.

Thermal

Hydroelectric

Solar

Wind (Aeolic)

References 

 UTE - Sistema Eléctrico
 El Observador - Culminaron obra de planta solar a gran escala en Salto
 Energía Eólica en Uruguay - Parques en Uruguay

Uruguay
Power stations in Uruguay
Power stations